Sohrtamp is a village in Birk Rural District, in the Central District of Mehrestan County, Sistan and Baluchestan Province, Iran. At the 2006 census, its population was 32, in 7 families.

References 

Populated places in Mehrestan County